Sheikhan cemetery (means scholars cemetery) is the second historical cemetery in the Islamic world and one of the oldest cemeteries in Qom, Qom Province, Iran which is located near the Fatima Masumeh Shrine. The cemetery dates back over a thousand years.

This cemetery is currently the burial place of some Shiite scholars such as Zakaria ibn Idris Ash'ari Qomi, Zakaria ibn Adam Ash'ari Qomi, Mirza-ye Qomi, Mohammad Ali Modarres Khiabani and Mahmoud Ansari Qomi, as well as those killed during the Iranian Revolution (1979) and Iranian soldiers killed during the Iran-Iraq war.

The eight victims of the June 28, 1981 terrorist attack in Tehran, Iran, along with their families, as well as Dr. Mohammad Gharib (father of Pediatrics in Iran) are buried in this cemetery. Also, Mirza Jawad Maleki Tabrizi, the famous Faqīh and Mysticism as well as Fakhr al-Sadat Borghei, one of the victims of the Chain murders of Iran, are buried in this cemetery.

Gallery

See also
 Behesht-e Zahra
 Doulab Cemetery
 Ibn Babawayh Cemetery
 Imamzadeh Abdollah, Ray

References

External links
 Image / Sheikhan Cemetery in Qom
 Sheikhan cemetery report by HAUSA
 Sheikhan Cemetery Introduction Video

Cemeteries in Qom
Cemeteries in Iran